Liam Aylward (born 27 September 1952) is a former Irish Fianna Fáil politician who served as a Minister of State from 1988 to 1989, from 1992 to 1994 and from 2004 to 2004. He served as a Member of the European Parliament (MEP) for the East constituency from 2004 to 2014. He was a Teachta Dála (TD) for the Carlow–Kilkenny constituency from 1977 to 2007. 

Aylward was born in Waterford in 1952, but is a native of Mullinavat, County Kilkenny. He was educated at St Kieran's College, Kilkenny. He worked as a laboratory technician before getting involved in politics. He was elected to Kilkenny County Council in 1974, and served on that authority until 1992.

Aylward was first elected to Dáil Éireann as a Fianna Fáil TD for the Carlow–Kilkenny constituency at the 1977 general election in what proved to be a landslide for Fianna Fáil. He served as Minister of State at the Department of Energy (1988–1989), Minister of State at the Department of Education (1992–1994) and the Minister of State at the Department of Agriculture and Food (2002–2004). In 1998, Aylward was the subject of a complaint to Oireachtas authorities for groping a female usher in the Dáil bar, for which he apologised.

In June 2004, he was elected to the European Parliament for the East constituency for Fianna Fáil, which was then part of the Union for a Europe of Nations. After the 2009 European Parliament election, Fianna Fáil joined the ALDE group. Aylward became a member of the Committee on Agriculture and Rural Development, the delegation for relations with Mercosur, and the delegation to the Euro-Latin American Parliamentary Assembly. He also became a substitute member of the Committee on Culture and Education and the delegation to the ACP–EU Joint Parliamentary Assembly.

Owing to the dual mandate legislation that forbids members of the European Parliament from seeking re-election as members of their national legislatures, he retired from national politics at the 2007 general election. He was succeeded as a Fianna Fáil TD by his brother Bobby Aylward. They are sons of Bob Aylward, who served as a Fianna Fáil Senator from 1973 to 1974.

Aylward has opted not to receive a ministerial pension, but still receives annual pension payments of around €50,000 from his time as a TD.

He retired from politics at the 2014 European Parliament election.

See also
Families in the Oireachtas

References

External links

 

1952 births
Living people
Fianna Fáil MEPs
Fianna Fáil TDs
Local councillors in County Kilkenny
Members of the 21st Dáil
Members of the 22nd Dáil
Members of the 23rd Dáil
Members of the 24th Dáil
Members of the 25th Dáil
Members of the 26th Dáil
Members of the 27th Dáil
Members of the 28th Dáil
Members of the 29th Dáil
MEPs for the Republic of Ireland 2004–2009
MEPs for the Republic of Ireland 2009–2014
Ministers of State of the 25th Dáil
Ministers of State of the 26th Dáil
Ministers of State of the 27th Dáil
Ministers of State of the 29th Dáil